Hernan Behn (February 19,1880 Saint Thomas, Virgin Islands– October 7, 1933 in Saint-Jean-de-Luz, France co-founded the Puerto Rico Telephone Company which eventually spawned ITT. Behn, along with his brother Sosthenes built the Two Brothers Bridge —Puente Dos Hermanos in Spanish— in San Juan. The bridge links the districts of Condado and Old San Juan.

See also
Telecommunications in Puerto Rico

References

20th-century Puerto Rican businesspeople
1880 births
1933 deaths
ITT Inc. people
 American people of Danish descent
 Puerto Rican people of Danish descent
 American people of French descent
 Puerto Rican people of French descent
 American expatriates in France
Puerto Rican expatriates in France